Townsend Creek is a stream in Bourbon and Harrison counties, Kentucky, in the United States. It is a tributary of the South Fork Licking River.

It was named for John Townsend, who settled near the creek in 1775.

See also
List of rivers of Kentucky

References

Rivers of Bourbon County, Kentucky
Rivers of Harrison County, Kentucky
Rivers of Kentucky
Licking River (Kentucky)